BNS Titumir is a naval base of the Bangladeshi Navy, founded after the Bangladesh Liberation War of 1971, and located in Khulna. Till 1971 it was titled as PNS Titumir as Bangladesh was then part of Pakistan.

Career
The Titumir is currently under the command of the Commander Khulna Naval Area  (COMKHUL). About 2500 personnel serve at Titumir, which is one of the largest bases in the Bangladesh Navy. It also provides some naval training.  Some training schools located here are

School of logistics and management: Providing relative Bachelor degrees under the Bangladesh National University.
New Entry Training school (NET school): Providing initial training for sailors under the naval syllabus.

See also
List of active ships of the Bangladesh Navy
Titumir

References

Bangladesh Navy bases
Khulna
Shore establishments of the Bangladesh Navy